Tawni O'Dell (born 1964) is an American novelist.

Born and raised in Indiana, Pennsylvania, United States. O'Dell was born in the same town as movie actor Jimmy Stewart. The first in her family to attend college, she graduated from Northwestern University with a degree in journalism. She disliked journalism and preferred writing fiction. She lived for many years in the Chicago area before moving back to Pennsylvania, where she now lives with her two children.

O'Dell's literary career began with uncertainty. In 13 years she wrote six unpublished novels and collected over 300 rejection slips before her first novel Back Roads was published to enormous acclaim. The July 24th 2000 issue of People magazine featured her in a story and mentioned praise that Oprah Winfrey gave proclaiming her not only as "an author but a writer".

Works

 Back Roads, novel (New York: Viking, 2000)
 Coal Run, novel (New York: Viking, 2004)
 Sister Mine, novel (New York: Shaye Areheart Books, 2007)
 Fragile Beasts, novel (New York: Shaye Areheart Books, 2010)
 One of Us, novel (New York: Gallery Books, 2014)
 Angels Burning, novel (Gallery Books (5 Jan. 2016))

References

Source
 Contemporary Authors Online. The Gale Group, 2002. PEN (Permanent Entry Number):  0000142270.

External links
Official website
Interview with O'Dell

21st-century American novelists
American women novelists
Living people
1964 births
Writers from Pittsburgh
People from Indiana, Pennsylvania
21st-century American women writers
Medill School of Journalism alumni
Novelists from Pennsylvania